Renee Trost (born 12 October 1980) is a former field hockey player from Australia, who played as a midfielder.

Personal life
Renee Trost was born and raised in Albury, NSW, however now resides in Melbourne, VIC.

She is currently working as a Naturopath in Melbourne.

Career

Domestic hockey

Club hockey
During her career, Trost's home club in Hockey Victoria's Premier League competition was Waverley. She also previously played for Camberwell.

AHL
Trost made her debut into Hockey Australia's premier domestic competition, the Australian Hockey League (AHL) in 2000, as a member of the VIC Vipers. Her AHL career spanned twelve seasons, culminating at the 2011 Tournament. She only won a national title on one occasion, in 2003.

International hockey
Renee Trost made her senior international debut for Australia in 2007, at the FIH Champions Trophy in Quilmes.

Trost made a small number of appearances in 2008, however was precluded from the squad shortly after.

Following three years out of the national squad, Trost returned to the team in 2011 with ambitions of playing at the 2012 Olympic Games in London.

International goals

References

External links

1980 births
Living people
Australian female field hockey players
Female field hockey midfielders
Sportswomen from New South Wales
Sportspeople from Albury